Prince Michael of Greece and Denmark,  (born 7 January 1939) is a Greek prince, historian, and author. He has written several historical books and biographies of Greek and other European figures, in addition to working as a contributing writer to Architectural Digest.

He is a first cousin of the late Prince Philip, Duke of Edinburgh, consort of Queen Elizabeth II of the United Kingdom.

Birth and family 
He was born in Rome to Prince Christopher of Greece and Denmark (youngest son of King George I of Greece) and his second wife Princess Françoise d'Orléans of France (daughter of the Orleanist claimant to the defunct French throne, Prince Jean d'Orléans, Duke of Guise).
His godparents were his two first cousins Queen Helen, Queen Mother of Romania and King George II of Greece (eldest children of his paternal uncle King Constantine I).

His father died when he was a year old, leaving Michael an only child, and his mother died in 1953 when he was 14, leaving him an orphan. Although a Greek prince, like many members of his dynasty he grew up largely abroad, sometimes in exile. As Europe marched into World War II, the infant Michael's family scattered: his mother's father, the Duke of Guise, left his residence of exile in Brussels, the Manoir d'Anjou, for their property at Larache, Morocco in March 1939 where he died on 24 August, the Manoir having become the Belgian headquarters for Germany's invading Wehrmacht.

Less than six months after her father's death, Françoise was widowed by the death of Prince Christopher, following an abscess of the lung, in Athens in January. She took Michael to join her mother's household in Larache where her elder sister, Princess Isabelle Murat and her family, had also taken refuge from Europe. Their brother, Henri, Count of Paris, who succeeded his own father as head of the Orleanist monarchist movement, sent for his wife and children to come from their relatives in Brazil, and by the spring of 1941 they too were settled in Spanish Morocco (still being banned from the French sector), near Casablanca, in a small house without electricity that was named Oued Akreech in the town of Rabat. Michael lived his early childhood years on the African continent in the midst of his mother's family. Later, they also spent time in Spain.

By the time Michael's mother died in Paris in early 1953, France had repealed the law of banishment against its former ruling families (24 June 1950) and the Comte de Paris had taken up residence in the capital. When, in August 1953, Monseigneur moved the Comtesse and their children to a new estate, the Manoir du Cœur Volant in Louveciennes, Michael joined the couple and their four eldest children in the main building, while the seven younger children and their governesses occupied an annex given the name la maison de Blanche Neige ("Snow White's cottage"). Henceforth, Michael was given into the care of his uncle and raised with his Orléans cousins.

Michael later acknowledged that his uncle had been a poor manager of his ward's assets, but maintained that there was no malfeasance or attempt to conceal losses. He would also comment that, allegations to the contrary notwithstanding, his uncle's notorious relationship with his assistant Monique Friesz in his later years, during which substantial assets were presumed to have been consumed or diverted, did not reflect manipulation on her part so much as the desire of the Comte de Paris for companionship when he chose to isolate himself from the society, culture and luxury to which he had previously been accustomed.
 
He is the last surviving grandchild of George I of Greece and one of the 2 last surviving great-grandchildren of Christian IX of Denmark (the other is his second cousin Christian Castenskiold, son of Princess Dagmar of Denmark).

Activities 
Michael studied political science in Paris. He then re-patriated to Greece for military duty, serving a term in the Hellenic Coast Guard, discharged with the rank of Sub-lieutenant.

He inherited from his mother a half-interest in the domain of the Nouvion-en-Thiérache, once the seat of the Dukes of Guise, from whom the Bourbon-Orléans inherited the vast property, which included a grand château and a petit château, in Aisne. The Comte de Paris owned the other half of the Nouvion. He and Michael sold the grand château in 1980 to the city of Roubaix, which subsequently became a conference center for environmental studies, while the petit château was sold in 1986 to the local government of Nouvion.

List of works 
Having watched his mother observe a family tradition by igniting what he called a kind of auto-da-fé in which she burned his late father's papers and memorabilia following the sale of his villa in Rome after the war, Prince Michael grew up to become a biographer and historian. He has written several biographies about members of ruling dynasties, those about contemporaries often including  accounts and anecdotes attributed to his royal relatives. He has also written novels about historical royalty, distinguished for meticulous detail.

In English: 
 Sultana (1983, reprinted several times)
 Louis XIV, the other side of the sun (1984)
 Rani, La femme sacrée, a novelised but well documented biography of the Rani of Jhansi (French: 1984 ; English: 2013)  
 The royal house of Greece (1988), illustrated album 
 Living with ghosts (1995) 
 The Empress of Farewells: the story of Charlotte, Empress of Mexico (1998) 
 The White Night of St. Petersburg (2000), historical novel
 Jewels of the Tsars (2006), illustrated album
 Le Rajah Bourbon (2007)
 Voices of light (2012), illustrated by Marina Karella

Marriage and issue 
Michael married Marina Karella (b. 17 July 1940) on 7 February 1965 in Athens, daughter of Theodore Karella and Ellie Chalikiopoulos. Marina is a Greek artist and sculptor of international reputation whose work has often been exhibited in Athens, Paris and New York. The marriage was held at the Royal Palace in Athens. This was a non-dynastic marriage, which obtained the legally required authorisation of King Constantine II only after Michael renounced all rights of succession to the Greek throne for himself and his descendants.

The couple has two daughters:
 Princess Alexandra Elli Francisca Maria of Greece (born 15 October 1968), married to Nicolas Mirzayantz on 27 June 1998. They have two sons: Tigran (16 August 2000) and Darius (April 2002).
Princess Olga Isabelle of Greece (born 17 November 1971), married in 2008 to her second cousin Prince Aimone of Savoy, 6th Duke of Aosta, a member of the former royal family of Italy. Aimone and Olga are the parents of two sons, Prince Umberto (b. 7 March 2009) and Prince Amedeo (b. 2011), and of a daughter, Princess Isabella (b. 2012).

Titles, styles, honours and arms

Titles and styles 
7 January 1939 – present: His Royal Highness Prince Michael of Greece and Denmark.

Honours 
 : Grand Cross of the Royal Order of the Redeemer.
 : Grand Cross with Collar of the Royal Order of Saints George and Constantine.

Foreign honours 
 : Knight of the Order of the Elephant (R.E., 11 September 1964).
  Empire of Iran: Recipient of the Commemorative Medal of the 2500th Anniversary of the founding of the Persian Empire (14 October 1971).

Ancestry

See also 
 Royal descendants of Queen Victoria and King Christian IX

References

External links 
Prince Michael's Chronicles

1939 births
Living people
House of Glücksburg (Greece)
Danish princes
Greek princes
Writers from Paris
House of Romanov in exile
Members of the Church of Greece